Alexander Eduardovich Panzhinskiy (born March 16, 1989) is a Russian cross-country skier who has competed since 2007. His best World Cup finish was fifth in a sprint event in Estonia in January 2010.

Career
In the 2010 Olympics, Panzhinskiy finished second in the sprint, behind fellow Russian Nikita Kryukov.

In the 2011 World Championships in Holmenkollen, Panzhinskiy finished third in the team sprint event, together with his teammate Kryukov.

Cross-country skiing results
All results are sourced from the International Ski Federation (FIS).

Olympic Games
 1 medal – (1 silver)

World Championships
 1 medal – (1 bronze)

World Cup

Season standings

References

External links
 

1989 births
Living people
Sportspeople from Khabarovsk
Cross-country skiers at the 2010 Winter Olympics
Cross-country skiers at the 2018 Winter Olympics
Olympic cross-country skiers of Russia
Russian male cross-country skiers
Olympic silver medalists for Russia
Olympic medalists in cross-country skiing
FIS Nordic World Ski Championships medalists in cross-country skiing
Medalists at the 2010 Winter Olympics